Angela Katherine Greene (born Angela Catherine Williams;  24 February 1921  – 9 February 1978) was an Irish-American actress.

Biography
Born in Dublin as Angela Catherine Williams, she was the only daughter of Margaret ( Greene) and Joseph Williams. At the age of six, she was adopted by her maternal uncle, Eddie Greene, and moved to Flushing, Queens.

Before becoming an actress, Greene was a model for the John Robert Powers agency.

Her films included Shotgun (1955), The Lady Wants Mink (1953), Hollywood Canteen (1944), The Time, the Place and the Girl (1946), Stallion Road (1947), At War with the Army (1950), A Perilous Journey (1953), The Cosmic Man (1959), and Futureworld (1976).

Personal life
After having dated naval lieutenant John F. Kennedy, she married Stuart Warren Martin on 7 December 1946. They divorced in 1975.

Death
Angela Greene died of a stroke in Los Angeles, shortly before her 57th birthday.

Partial filmography

 Mr. Skeffington (1944) - Hairdresser (uncredited)
 The Very Thought of You (1944) - Nurse (uncredited)
 Hollywood Canteen (1944) - Junior Hostess (uncredited)
 Mildred Pierce (1945) - Party Guest (uncredited)
 Too Young to Know (1945) - Party Guest #6
 Cinderella Jones (1946) - Waitress (uncredited)
 Humoresque (1946) - Tipsy Blonde at Wright's Party (uncredited)
 The Time, the Place and the Girl (1946) - Elaine Winters
 That Way with Women (1947) - Blonde Baseball Fan (uncredited)
 Stallion Road (1947) - Lana Rock
 Love and Learn (1947) - Phyllis McGillicuddy
 Escape Me Never (1947) - Girl (uncredited)
 King of the Bandits (1947) - Alice Mason
 Wallflower (1948) - Miss Walsh (uncredited)
 At War with the Army (1950) - Mrs. Deborah Caldwell
 Jungle Jim in the Forbidden Land (1952) - Dr. Linda Roberts
 The Lady Wants Mink (1953) - Marge (uncredited)
 A Perilous Journey (1953) - Mavis
 Loose in London (1953) - Lady Marcia
 The Royal African Rifles (1953) - Karen Van Stede
 Shotgun (1955) - Aletha
 Affair in Reno (1957) - Gloria Del Monte
 Spoilers of the Forest (1957) - Camille
 Night of the Blood Beast (1958) - Dr. Julie Benson
 The Cosmic Man (1959) - Kathy Grant
 Tickle Me (1965) - Donna
 The Good Guys and the Bad Guys (1969) - Judy (uncredited)
 Pete 'n' Tillie (1972) - Party Guest (uncredited)
 The Day of the Locust (1975) - Guest #4
 Futureworld (1976) - Mrs. Reed (final film role)

Notes

References

External links 

 

American film actresses
American television actresses
1921 births
1978 deaths
People from Flushing, Queens
Irish emigrants to the United States